Augustin Félix Fortin (1763–1832), a French painter of landscapes, and of genre and historical subjects, was born in Paris in 1763, and studied under his uncle, the sculptor Félix Lecomte. He was, however, chiefly noted for his sculpture, for which he obtained the Prix de Rome in 1783. He became a member of the Académie royale de peinture et de sculpture in 1789, and died in Paris in 1832.

Among his paintings are:
Invocation to Nature.
A Satyr.
Lesbia.

Examples of sculptures:
 Sculptured memorial wall plaque in Carrara marble commemorating the passing in 1808, in Malta, of Louis Charles, Count of Beaujolais, and brother of future King of France Louis Philippe I. Completed in 1819 and located in the Chapel of France in St. John's Co-Cathedral, Valletta, Malta, to mark the place where the count is buried.

References

Attribution:

External links

 

1763 births
1832 deaths
18th-century French painters
French male painters
19th-century French painters
Painters from Paris
Members of the Académie des beaux-arts
Prix de Rome for sculpture
19th-century French sculptors
French male sculptors
19th-century French male artists
18th-century French male artists